Weston-super-Mare Town Hall is a municipal building in Walliscote Grove Road in Weston-super-Mare, Somerset, England. The building, which is the headquarters of North Somerset Council, is a Grade II listed building.

History
After town commissioners were appointed in 1842, one of their early actions was to identify a suitable meeting place: initially they met in the old Plough Hotel in the High Street and then, from 1848, in a Wesleyan Chapel. Finding this arrangement inadequate, they decided to procure a bespoke town hall: the site they selected was in a rapidly developing part of the town close to the proposed new Weston-super-Mare railway station. However, after the town clerk declared a personal interest in the land, and concerns were raised about the probity of the transaction, the local rector, The Venerable Henry Law, acquired the land himself and gifted it to the town commissioners.

The new building was designed by James Wilson in the Italianate style, built at a cost of £3,000 and completed in 1856. The original design involved a symmetrical main frontage with three bays facing onto Walliscote Grove Road (the left hand section of the current structure); the central bay featured an arched doorway with an elaborate carved pediment with twin round headed windows on the first floor and an oculus above.

The town hall was extended to the north along Walliscote Grove Road to a design by Hans Price in 1897: the central section, which projected forward, involved an arcaded porte-cochère with four round headed windows on the first floor, flanked by Corinthian order columns, and a pediment above. It also involved a tall clock tower, set back from the front of the building, with bells cast by Llewellyns of Bristol. A right hand section, which was built in a style which was sympathetic to the original left hand section and which extended along Oxford Street, was completed in 1927. Internally, the principal room in the new extension was the new council chamber.

The building continued to serve as the headquarters of Weston-super-Mare Municipal Borough Council and remained the local seat of government after the enlarged Woodspring District Council was formed in 1974. A large modern red-brick extension was built behind the town hall for use by Woodspring District Council in the 1970s. The town hall then became the home of the new unitary authority for the area, North Somerset Council, in 1996.

The 1970s extension was extensively refurbished and enhanced by Willmott Dixon at a cost of £10 million, to a design by Alec French Architects, to facilitate open plan working and to create a new district library in 2012. Additionally, a new police inquiries desk was established in the town hall in 2013.

References

Government buildings completed in 1856
City and town halls in Somerset
Grade II listed buildings in North Somerset
Buildings and structures in Weston-super-Mare